Eliza Fanny Staveley (1831–1903), published as E.F. Staveley, was a British entomologist, arachnologist, and author. Her work British Insects (1871) was favourably reviewed by Alfred Russel Wallace in Nature.

Life 

Eliza Fanny Staveley was born in Kensington, London in 1831, to Thomas Staveley and Eliza Wowski (née Dickenson).

During the 1860s, Stavely conducted anatomical studies of spiders and hymenopterous insects, focusing particularly on the study of hooks on insect wings and teeth in spiders. Entomologist Frederick Smith, who worked in the zoology department of the British Museum, assisted Staveley in providing a collection of wings for study. Staveley was an associate of naturalist John Edward Gray, who read papers she had prepared to the Linnean and Zoological Societies of London.

Following the publication of British Insects in 1871, naturalist Alfred Russel Wallace reviewed the work for the journal Nature. He wrote that he could:conscientiously recommend this book as admirably adapted to lead its readers to observe for themselves the varied phenomena presented by insects, and thus to become true entomologists.Horticulturist Theresa Earle also wrote favourably of her 1866 work British Spiders, describing it as: a very good book... which would tell all that anyone might want to know about these insects. The first page illustrates spiders' heads, with the varying numbers of eyes the different kinds possess.Eliza Fanny Staveley died in 1903 in Tunbridge Wells, aged 72.

Works 
As listed on the Biodiversity Heritage Library:

 'Observations on the neuration of the hind wings of Hymenopterous insects: and on the hooks which join the fore and hind wings together in flight' (1860)
 'Notes on the Form of the Comb (Pecten) in Different Andrenidae and Apidae, and on the Alar Hooks of the Species of Sphecodes and Halictus' (1862) in Proceedings of the Zoological Society of London
 British spiders: an introduction to the study of the Araneidae of Great Britain and Ireland (1866)
 'Note on the presence of teeth on the Maxillæ of Spiders' (1866) in The Annals and magazine of natural history; zoology, botany, and geology Vol. 17, No. 3
 British Insects: a familiar description of the form, structure, habits, and transformations of insects (1871)

References

External links 

 Works by E.F. Staveley at Worldcat
 Works by E.F. Staveley at HathiTrust

1831 births
1903 deaths
English naturalists
English women scientists
English entomologists
19th-century English women writers
British Museum
Linnean Society of London
Zoological Society of London
Entomologists from London
Women entomologists
19th-century British women scientists
British arachnologists
People from Kensington